Weener is a railway station in the village of Weener in Germany. It is located on the Ihrhove–Nieuweschans railway between Leer and Bad Nieuweschans (Netherlands). Due to the destruction of a bridge near Weener, a bus service is provided by Arriva.

Train services
The normal service at the station is:

1x per hour local services (stoptrein): Groningen – Bad Nieuweschans – Leer

Due to the closure of the railway, a rail replacement bus service is provided.

History 
On 3 December 2015, the coaster  collided with the Friesenbrücke, a bridge carrying the railway over the Ems near Weener, blocking both railway and river. The completion of the bridge is planned for 2024.

References

External links 

Buildings and structures in Leer (district)
Railway stations in Lower Saxony